Constantine I (? – 9 August 677) was the patriarch of Constantinople from 675 to 677. He is listed as a saint, feast day July 29, on Wikipedia Eastern Orthodox Litúrgics. He was preceded by John V of Constantinople. He was succeeded by Theodore I of Constantinople.

References 

7th-century patriarchs of Constantinople